Virginia Maria Hernandez Covington (born July 12, 1955) is a senior United States district judge of the United States District Court for the Middle District of Florida.

Early life and education 

Covington was born on July 12, 1955 in Tampa, Florida. She received her Bachelor of Science degree cum laude from the University of Tampa in 1976, where she received the Outstanding Female Graduate Award. She received her Master of Business Administration from the University of Tampa in 1977 and her Juris Doctor from Georgetown University Law Center in 1980. At Georgetown she was elected to the Tax Lawyer law journal.

Career 

Covington served as a trial attorney for the Federal Trade Commission from 1980 to 1981. She served as an assistant state attorney for the 13th Judicial Circuit of Florida (Hillsborough County) from 1982 to 1983. Covington served as an Assistant U.S. Attorney for the Middle District of Florida from 1983 to 2001, working in the United States Department of Justice Civil Division from 1983 to 1988 and as Assistant U.S. Attorney as chief of the Asset Forfeiture Section in the United States Department of Justice Criminal Division from 1989 to 2001. On September 25, 2001, Florida Governor Jeb Bush appointed Covington to the Florida Second District Court of Appeal.

Federal judicial service 

President George W. Bush nominated Covington to the United States District Court for the Middle District of Florida on April 20, 2004, to the seat vacated by Ralph Wilson Nimmons, Jr. She was confirmed by the Senate on September 7, 2004, she received her commission three days later. Covington serves on the Tampa Division of the court. She assumed senior status on July 12, 2020.

See also 
 List of Hispanic/Latino American jurists
 List of first women lawyers and judges in Florida

References

Sources 
 

1955 births
Living people
21st-century American judges
Assistant United States Attorneys
Federal Trade Commission personnel
Florida state court judges
Georgetown University Law Center alumni
Hispanic and Latino American judges
Judges of the Florida District Courts of Appeal
Judges of the United States District Court for the Middle District of Florida
People from Tampa, Florida
State attorneys
United States district court judges appointed by George W. Bush
University of Tampa alumni
21st-century American women judges
American judges of Cuban descent
Florida Women's Hall of Fame Inductees